The Brigantes were Ancient Britons who in pre-Roman times controlled the largest section of what would become Northern England. Their territory, often referred to as Brigantia, was centred in what was later known as Yorkshire. The Greek geographer Ptolemy named the Brigantes as a people in Ireland also, where they could be found around what is now Wexford, Kilkenny and Waterford, while another people named Brigantii is mentioned by Strabo as a sub-tribe of the Vindelici in the region of the Alps.

Within Britain, the territory which the Brigantes inhabited was bordered by that of four other peoples: the Carvetii in the northwest, the Parisii to the east and, to the south, the Corieltauvi and the Cornovii. To the north was the territory of the Votadini, which straddled the present day border between England and Scotland.

Etymology
The name Brigantes (Βρίγαντες in Ancient Greek) shares the same Proto-Celtic root as the goddess Brigantia, *brigant- meaning "high, elevated", and it is unclear whether settlements called Brigantium were so named as "high ones" in a metaphorical sense of nobility, or literally as "highlanders", referring to the Pennines, or inhabitants of physically elevated fortifications. (IEW, s.v. "bhereg'h-"). The word is related to German Burgund and Iranian Alborz (OIr. Hara Berezaiti).

In modern Welsh the word braint means 'privilege, prestige' and comes from the same root *brigantī.  Other related forms from the modern Celtic languages are: Welsh brenin 'king' (< *brigantīnos); Welsh/Cornish/Breton bri 'prestige, reputation, honour, dignity', Scottish Gaelic brìgh 'pith, power', Irish brí 'energy, significance', Manx bree 'power, energy' (all < *brīg-/brigi-); and Welsh/Cornish/Breton bre 'hill' (< *brigā).  The name Bridget from Old Irish Brigit (Modern Irish Bríd) also comes from Brigantī, as does the English river name Brent and the connected area Brentford.

There are several ancient settlements named Brigantium around Europe, such as Berganza in Álava (Spain), A Coruña and Bergantiños in Galicia (Spain), Bragança and Braga in Portugal and  Briançon, Brigetio on the border of Slovakia and Hungary, Brigobanne situated on the Breg river and near the Brigach river in south Germany (pre-Roman Vindelicia) and Bregenz in the Alps. From the same origin also stems the name of the Italian sub-region of Brianza.

In chronostratigraphy, the British sub-stage of the Carboniferous period, the Brigantian, derives its name from the Brigantes.

History

There are no written records of the Brigantes before the Roman conquest of Britain; it is therefore hard to assess how long they had existed as a political entity prior to that. Most key archaeological sites in the region seem to show continued, undisturbed occupation from an early date, so their rise to power may have been gradual rather than a sudden, dramatic conquest, or it may be linked to the burning of the large hill fort at Castle Hill, Huddersfield, c. 430 BC. Territorially the largest tribe in Britain, the Brigantes encompassed sub-tribes or septs such as the Gabrantovices on the Yorkshire Coast, and the Textoverdi in the upper valley of the River South Tyne near Hadrian's Wall. The names Portus Setantiorum and Coria Lopocarum suggest other groups, the Setantii and the Lopocares located on the Lancashire coast and the River Tyne respectively. A name Corionototae is also recorded but since the name seems to derive from *Corion Toutas meaning "tribal army" or "people's army" it may have been a name for a military force or resistance against the Romans rather than any tribe or sub-tribe. The Carvetii who occupied what is now Cumbria may have been another sub-tribe, or they may have been separate from the Brigantes. This is often disputed as the Carvetii made up a separate civitas under Roman rule.

Roman era
During the Roman invasion, in 47 AD, the governor of Britain, Publius Ostorius Scapula, was forced to abandon his campaign against the Deceangli of North Wales because of "disaffection" among the Brigantes, whose leaders had been allies of Rome. A few of those who had taken up arms were killed and the rest were pardoned. In 51, the defeated resistance leader Caratacus sought sanctuary with the Brigantian queen, Cartimandua, but she showed her loyalty to the Romans by handing him over in chains. She and her husband Venutius are described as loyal and "defended by Roman arms", but they later divorced, Venutius taking up arms first against his ex-wife, then her Roman protectors. During the governorship of Aulus Didius Gallus (52–57) he gathered an army and invaded her kingdom. The Romans sent troops to defend Cartimandua, and they defeated Venutius' rebellion. After the divorce, Cartimandua married Venutius' armour-bearer, Vellocatus, and raised him to the kingship. Venutius staged another rebellion in 69, taking advantage of Roman instability in the Year of four emperors. This time the Romans were only able to send auxiliaries, who succeeded in evacuating Cartimandua but left Venutius and his anti-Roman supporters in control of the kingdom.

The extensive Iron Age fortifications at Stanwick in North Yorkshire were excavated in the 1950s by Mortimer Wheeler who concluded that Venutius probably had this site as his capital, but Durham University's later excavations from 1981 to 1986 led Colin Haselgrove and Percival Turnbull to suggest a slightly earlier dating with Stanwick a centre of power for Cartimandua instead.

After the accession of Vespasian, Quintus Petillius Cerialis was appointed governor of Britain and the conquest of the Brigantes was begun. It seems to have taken many decades to complete. Gnaeus Julius Agricola (governor 78–84) appears to have engaged in warfare in Brigantian territory. The Roman poet Juvenal, writing in the early 2nd century, depicts a Roman father urging his son to win glory by destroying the forts of the Brigantes. There appears to have been a rebellion in the north sometime in the early reign of Hadrian, but details are unclear. A rising of the Brigantes has often been posited as the explanation for the disappearance of the Ninth Legion, stationed at York. It is possible that one of the purposes of Hadrian's Wall (begun in 122) was to keep the Brigantes from making discourse with the tribes in what is now the lowlands of Scotland on the other side. The emperor Antoninus Pius (138–161) is said by Pausanias to have defeated them after they began an unprovoked war against Roman allies, perhaps as part of the campaign that led to the building of the Antonine Wall (142–144).

Tacitus, in a speech put into the mouth of the Caledonian leader Calgacus, refers to the Brigantes, "under a woman's leadership", almost defeating the Romans.

Settlements

Ptolemy named nine principal poleis (cities) or towns belonging to the Brigantes, these were:

Other settlements known in Brigantian territory include:

Wincobank, on the border of Sheffield
Bremetenacum Veteranorum (Ribchester, Lancashire)
Calcaria (Tadcaster, North Yorkshire) - mentioned in the Antonine Itinerary and the Ravenna Cosmography
Luguvalium (Carlisle, Cumbria) - probably a settlement of the Carvetii
Coria (Corbridge, Northumberland) - perhaps a settlement of the Lopocares

Brigantes in Ireland
The Brigantes are attested in Ireland as well as Britain in Ptolemy's 2nd century Geographia, but it is not clear what link, if any, existed between the Irish and the British Brigantes. T. F. O'Rahilly proposed that the Irish branch was the origin of the later Uí Bairrche clan, believing that they belonged to the Érainn (Ptolemy's Iverni) who he hypothesized were originally descendant from the Gaulish and British Belgae according to his model of Irish prehistory. Professor John T. Koch posits links between the British and Irish groups, identifying the Romano-British goddess Brigantia with the Irish Brigid and pointing to a possibly Roman or Romano-British burial in Stonyford, County Kilkenny. He identifies the Irish Brigantes with the early mediaeval Uí Brigte clan.

In popular culture
 The 2010 film Centurion follows the destiny of the Ninth Legion, seen from the perspective of centurion Quintus Dias.  Both the Ninth and Dias become embroiled in the machinations of Etain (Olga Kurylenko), a Brigantes warrior, acting as a scout, when she subsequently betrays them to the Picts.
 In the 1954 novel The Eagle of the Ninth by Rosemary Sutcliff, one of the main characters is Esca, the captured son of a chieftain of the Brigantes, who travels with the Roman soldier Marcus Aquila north of Hadrian's Wall to discover what happened to the Legio IX Hispana. The character was played by Christian Rodska in the 1977 BBC adaptation and Jamie Bell in the 2011 film adaptation The Eagle.
 In 2020, the English rugby league club, Wigan Warriors, referenced a Brigante warrior in their new club logo claiming that the Brigantes "had roots and lineage in the town of Wigan".

References

Further reading

External links
Brigantes Nation
Brigantes at Roman-Britain.co.uk

Historical Celtic peoples
Briton people
Prehistoric Ireland
Tribes of ancient Ireland